Kankoyo is a constituency of the National Assembly of Zambia. It covers Kankoyo and the rural area to the north-west of Mufulira in Mufulira District of Copperbelt Province.

List of MPs

References

Constituencies of the National Assembly of Zambia
Constituencies established in 1973
1973 establishments in Zambia